Katham Katham is a 2015 Indian Tamil-language action film directed by newcomer Babu Thooyavan, son of veteran writer Thooyavan. The film stars Nandha, Natarajan Subramaniam, Sanam Shetty and Sharika, and was produced by Appu Movies. The supporting cast includes Nizhalgal Ravi, Crane Manohar, Singamuthu, and Pandu.

Plot

Nandha (Nandha Durairaj) is an upright sub-inspector of police who has been transferred 15 times in three years. He is then transferred in a police station based in Pollachi. There, Police Inspector Pandian (Natarajan Subramaniam) is in the pay of Minister Periyannan (Rajagopalan), who runs in own government in the place. Nandha is shocked to note that Pandian and the entire police department are corrupt. Thereafter, Nandha tries hard to enforce the order. Soon, both policemen clash. Pandian becomes an honest policeman after Periyannan's men attempt to kill him, and he is revived with blood transfusions from the public. However, Nandha does not believe that he has truly changed. After a fellow honest sub-inspector gets killed by Periyannan's men, Nandha blames Pandian, and through short routes, becomes inspector himself. He arranges for Periyannan and his men to clash with Pandian, but in the ensuing fight, Pandian kills them all, while Nandha walks away.

Cast

 Nandha Durairaj as Sub-Inspector Nandha
 Natarajan Subramaniam as Inspector Pandian
 Sanam Shetty as Madhu
 Sharika as Priya
 Nizhalgal Ravi as SP Ravichandran
 Singamuthu as Constable Kumar
 Crane Manohar as Constable Swami Doss
 Pandu as Madhu's father
 Kaajal Pasupathi as Padmini
 Rajagopalan as Minister Periyannan
 Vinod as Sub-Inspector Kannan
 Harish as Sakthi, Periyannan's son
 K. R. Selvaraj as Nandha's father
 Soundar as Constable Soundar
 Seshu as Constable Unnikrishnan
 Mona Petra as DSP Deepthi Nair
 Sindhu as Manimekalai
 Maruthu Pandi
 Nisha Dass
 Muthu K Kumaran as Registar

Soundtrack
The music was composed by Taj Noor.

Critical reception
The movie opened to mixed reviews from critics. The Times of India gave the film 2.5 stars out of 5 and wrote, "This is pucca masala material and Babu Thooyavan does a fairly good job with it until the interval point. But the film fails to pick up steam...the script just fizzles out. There are no thrilling cat-and-mouse games and in their place all we get are predictable situations, a mood-killing love track...and a tame climax that is utterly disappointing". The Hindu wrote, "If the director had avoided the temptation of including "necessary commercial elements", Katham Katham would have been a quality film". Rediff gave it 1.5 stars out of 5 and wrote, "There are a few well-written dialogues, but a cliché ridden script, and ordinary execution by the debutant director makes Katham Katham a total waste of time". Sify called it "undoubtedly one of the worst films of the year in terms of story and production values"

References

External links
 

2010s Tamil-language films
Indian action films
2015 films
2015 directorial debut films
2010s masala films
Fictional portrayals of the Tamil Nadu Police
2015 action films